Madeleine Barbulée (2 September 1910 – 1 January 2001) was a French film, stage and television actress.

Selected filmography

 Métier de fous (1948)
 Les Casse Pieds (1948) - La chanteuse
 Pattes blanches (1949) - La cousine (uncredited)
 Mission in Tangier (1949) - Une dactylo du journal
 The Mystery of the Yellow Room (1949) - La femme de chambre
 Return to Life (1949) - (segment 5 : Le retour de Louis") (uncredited)
 Cage of Girls (1949) - Une surveillante
 Millionaires for One Day (1949) - L'infirmière
 Rome Express (1950) - La libraire
 Prélude à la gloire (1950) - Mademoiselle Duchemin
 Le tampon du capiston (1950) - Une invitée
 Le gang des tractions-arrière (1950)
 Beware of Blondes (1950) - Mme Dubois
 Without Leaving an Address (1951) - La marchande de jouets de la gare (uncredited)
 Darling Caroline (1951) - Mme de Tourville, la gouvernante
 Dr. Knock (1951) - Une infirmière (uncredited)
 The Strange Madame X (1951) - Marthe (uncredited)
 Beautiful Love (1951) - L'assistante du docteur Moulin
 La vie chantée (1951) - La maman
 The Voyage to America (1951) - L'économe
 La plus belle fille du monde (1951) - La secrétaire de l'agence
 Two Pennies Worth of Violets (1951) - La chanteuse des rues
 Great Man (1951) - Marie-Laure
 The Seven Deadly Sins (1952) -  La secrétaire céleste (segment "Paresse, La / Sloth")
 Forbidden Games (1952) - Une soeur de la Croix-Rouge
 Matrimonial Agency (1952) - Céline
 Ouvert contre X... (1952) - La voisine
 Trois femmes (1952)
 Monsieur Taxi (1952) - La tricoteuse
 Beauties of the Night (1952) - La femme au bureau de poste / Woman in post office (uncredited)
 La jeune folle (1952) - La voyageuse
 My Husband Is Marvelous (1952)
 Deux de l'escadrille (1953)
 Follow That Man (1953) - Mme Durbain - la concierge
 Mandat d'amener (1953) - La femme du juge
 The Earrings of Madame de… (1953) - Une amie de Madame de... (uncredited)
 Thérèse Raquin (1953) - Madame Noblet, une cliente
 Zoé (1954)
 After You Duchess (1954)
 Papa, Mama, the Maid and I (1955) - Marie-Louise, la première bonne
 Casse-cou, mademoiselle! (1955)
 Papa, maman, ma femme et moi (1955) - Une collègue de Fernand
 Le dossier noir (1955) - La soeur du procureur
 Frou-Frou (1955) - Berthe, l'habilleuse
 The Lowest Crime (1955) - L'infirmière
 Les aristocrates (1955) - L'hôtelière
 The Grand Maneuver (1955) - La dame au chapeau jaune
 The French, They Are a Funny Race (1955) - La femme de chambre
 Thirteen at the Table (1955) - (uncredited)
 La Bande à papa (1956) - Mme Merlerin
 Marie Antoinette Queen of France (1956) - Mme Sophie (uncredited)
 Mannequins of Paris (1956)) - Madame Madeleine - la première
 Plucking the Daisy (1956) - Madame Dumont
 Les lumières du soir (1956) - L'assistante sociale
 The Hunchback of Notre Dame (1956) - Madame Outarde
 I'll Get Back to Kandara (1956) - Madame Lachaume
 Les Collégiennes (1957) - Madame Letellier, la principale
 Sénéchal the Magnificent (1957) - Mme Roberte
 C'est une fille de Paname (1957)
 Quand la femme s'en mêle (1957) - La pâtissière
 In Case of Adversity (1958) - La cliente de la boucherie
 Les Misérables (1958) - Soeur Simplice
 Neither Seen Nor Recognized (1958) - Madame Chaville
 Love Is My Profession (1958) - Bordenave
 Le petit prof (1959) - La veuve Mouriot
 Guinguette (1959)
 Gangster Boss (1959) - Mme. Rivoire (uncredited)
 La bête à l'affût (1959) - Maria
 Soupe au lait (1959)
 Les affreux (1959) - La secrétaire
 Détournement de mineur (1960) - Christine's Mother
 Meurtre en 45 tours (1960) - La secrètaire
 La brune que voilà (1960) - Madame Sivelle - la gouvernante
 Coctail party (1960) - Julia Shuttlethwaite
 Les Tortillards (1960) - Adélaïde Benoît
 Un chien dans un jeu de quilles (1962) - La mère
 The Mysteries of Paris (1962) - Mme Godin
 La foire aux cancres (Chronique d'une année scolaire) (1963)
 Cent briques et des tuiles (1965) - Limonade
 Le dimanche de la vie (1967) - Madame Faucolle
 Pierre et Paul (1969) - Mathilde
 La maison des Bories (1970) - Mlle Estienne
 The Day of the Jackal (1973) - Hotel Guest (uncredited)
 A Slightly Pregnant Man (1973) - Mlle Janvier
 Le cri du coeur (1974) - Berthe / maid
 Incorrigible (1975) - La dame-pipi
 L'Avare (1980) - La mère de Marianne
 Les Séducteurs (1980) - Mamie (segment "The French Method")
 Banzaï (1983) - Vieille dame avion
 Vous habitez chez vos parents? (1983) - Mammy
 La 7ème cible (1984) - L'antiquaire aux puces
 La messe en si mineur (1990) - Madame Lopez
 Roulez jeunesse! (1993) - Lise

 References 

 Bibliography 
 Alison Smith. French Cinema in the 1970s: The Echoes of May''. Manchester University Press, 2005.

External links 
 

1910 births
2001 deaths
French film actresses
French stage actresses
French television actresses
Actors from Nancy, France
20th-century French actresses